Benthota Divisional Secretariat is a  Divisional Secretariat  of Galle District, of Southern Province, Sri Lanka.

References

Divisional Secretariats of Galle District